Onicha is a Local Government Area of Ebonyi State, Nigeria. It has an area of 476 km2 and has a population of 236,828 according to the 2006 census. The postal code of the area is 491. Its headquarters is located in the town of Isu. However, there are a number of towns and villages in the Southeastern part of Nigeria commonly referred to as "ISU". But the ISU in Ebonyi State, also known as Isu okoma is originally made up of Agbabor, Amanator, Isu Achara, Mgbaneze, Mgbana Ukwu, Obeagu, Umuniko among others was in Ohaozara Local Government Area Council until the creation of Onicha Area Council. Mgbaneze is a border town between Ebonyi and Enugu states and a host community to a newly established Federal College of Education (Technical).
Onicha Igbo-Eze is a town in Onicha Local Government Area from which the name of the area council is derived. Other major towns in the Area Council aside Isu the headquarters and Onicha Igbo-Eze are Oshiri, Ukawu and Aba-Omege. 
Despite their original names being identical, Onicha should not be confused with the major city of Onitsha located to its west in The question is what year was the onicha local government created

References

Onicha-Igboeze is a town in Onicha Local Government Council. The local government council got its name from this town. Onicha-Igboeze is an agrarian community. Some of the notable food crop farmed in this community are; Cassava ( a major staple) Yam, coco yam, groundnut and some other farm produce. Until recently, most of the farm produce were for consumption by the farmer and his family. but there is an increase in farming due to new access roads that has opened the town to other neighbouring towns and cities like Enugu and Abakaliki. There is a high demand of farm produce from these cities on the food production from Onicha-Igboeze and other neighbouring towns, such as Uburu, Okposi, Ugwulangwu, Osiri, Isu. etc.

The Town of Onicha-Igboeze is made up 13 villages namely; Eziga, Okpoma, Anike, Isiama, Ugwu-odida, Ezekporoke, Anwutu, others are, Amanator, Umubo, Umudomi, umuezikwu, Amata, Amakporo etc.

Local Government Areas in Ebonyi State